"Je cours" is a song by Belgian singer Stromae. It was released on his first studio album Cheese and is his fourth single.

Charts

Weekly charts

Year-end charts

References

2010 songs
French-language songs
Stromae songs